Discoduratere Nunatak is the rocky hill extending 180 m in southeast–northwest direction and 150 m wide, rising to 76 m at Quesada Cove on the north coast of Nelson Island in the South Shetland Islands, Antarctica.

The feature is named after the ancient Roman emporium and fortress of Discoduratere in Northern Bulgaria.

Location
British mapping of the area in 1968.

Maps
 Livingston Island to King George Island.  Scale 1:200000.  Admiralty Nautical Chart 1776. Taunton: UK Hydrographic Office, 1968
 South Shetland Islands. Scale 1:200000 topographic map No. 3373. DOS 610 - W 62 58. Tolworth, UK, 1968
 Antarctic Digital Database (ADD). Scale 1:250000 topographic map of Antarctica. Scientific Committee on Antarctic Research (SCAR). Since 1993, regularly upgraded and updated

Notes

References
 Discoduratere Nunatak. SCAR Composite Gazetteer of Antarctica
 Bulgarian Antarctic Gazetteer. Antarctic Place-names Commission. (details in Bulgarian, basic data in English)

External links
 Discoduratere Nunatak. Copernix satellite image

Nunataks of the South Shetland Islands
Bulgaria and the Antarctic